Kolding Fjord  is a 10 km long fjord between Kolding and Little Belt.

Fjord has a 7 meters deep ship channel linking it to Kolding port.

In 1943 a shipwreck later known as Kolding cog was found in the fjord.

See also
 Hotel Koldingfjord

Fjords of Denmark